Wang Sen (born 3 August 1989) is a Chinese actor. Since 2013, he has signed to Zhao Wei's Agency.

Filmography

Film

Television

References

External links

1989 births
Living people
Male actors from Beijing
21st-century Chinese male actors
Chinese male film actors